Saint-Barbant is a former commune in the Haute-Vienne department in the Nouvelle-Aquitaine region in west-central France. On 1 January 2019, it was merged into the new commune Val-d'Oire-et-Gartempe.

Inhabitants are known as Saint-Barbanteaux.

See also
Communes of the Haute-Vienne department

References

Former communes of Haute-Vienne